The One and Only Phyllis Dixey is a 1978 British television film directed by Michael Tuchner and starring Lesley-Anne Down, Michael Elphick and Patricia Hodge. Based on the career of the burlesque artist Phyllis Dixey, it was produced by Thames Television for screening on ITV.

Cast
 Lesley-Anne Down as Phyllis Dixey
 Christopher Murney as Jack Tracy 
 Michael Elphick as Wallace Parnell
 Jacqueline Tong as Judy
 Elaine Paige as Kim
 Patricia Hodge as Maisie
 Rosalind Wilson as Penny
 Gillian Hayes as Jane
 Joanne Whalley as Doris
 Gretchen Franklin as Phyllis's Dresser
 Sue Holderness as Mildred Challenger
 Richard LeParmentier as G.I. at Box Office 
 Geoffrey Lumsden as Judge
 Shane Rimmer as US Colonel
 Gordon Wharmby as Simmons
 Peter Settelen as Father McGuire
 Gillian Taylforth as Girl in café

References

Bibliography
 Newcomb, Horace . Encyclopedia of Television. Routledge, 2014.
 Potter, Jeremy. Independent Television in Britain: Volume 4: Companies and Programmes, 1968–80. Palgrave Macmillan, 1990.

External links
 

1978 television films
1978 films
British television films
English-language television shows
ITV television dramas
Films about striptease
Television shows produced by Thames Television